Abdul Jabbar Khan (1916 – 29 December 1993) was a Bangladeshi filmmaker. He was credited with directing Mukh O Mukhosh (1956), the first Bengali-language film ever made in the then East Pakistan (currently Bangladesh). The library of Bangladesh Film Development Corporation was named Abdul Jabbar Khan Library after him.

Early life and education
Abdul Jabbar khan was born in Masadgoan village in Dhaka-Bikrampur Bengal Presidency, British India (now in Lohajang Upazila of Munshiganj District, Bangladesh) in 1916. During his school days, Khan performed in plays like "Behula", "Vishwamangal", "Satirtha", "Samajpati", "Matir Ghar", and "Sohrab Rustam". In 1941, he earned a diploma from Ahsanullah School of Engineering.

Career
Khan founded Kamlapur Dramatic Association.

Mukh O Mukhosh
In 1953, at a cultural program, F. Dossani, a non-Bengali film producer, remarked that “The climate of this land is not fit for making movies.” Khan then decided to make a film based on his play "Dakaat". Khan released the film in Roopmahal Movie Theatre in Dhaka with the title Mukh O Mukhosh (The Face and the Mask) on 3 August 1956. He was the director, screenwriter and the lead actor of the film.

Works
 Mukh O Mukhosh (1956)
 Joar Elo (1962)
 Nachghar (1963, Urdu)
 Banshari (1968)
 Kanch Kata Hira (1970) 
 Khelaghar (1973)

Awards
 Bangladesh Film Journalists Association Award
 FDC Silver Jubilee Medal
 Uttaran Medal
 Hiralala Sen Memorial Medal
 Gold Medal of the Bikrampur Foundation

References

External links
 

1916 births
1993 deaths
Bangladeshi film directors
Place of death missing
Recipients of the Ekushey Padak